Foggaret Ezzoua is a municipality in In Salah District, In Salah Province, Algeria. According to the 2008 census it has a population of 6,649, up from 4,763 in 1998, with an annual growth rate of 3.5%. Its postal code is 11220 and its municipal code is 1110.

Geography 

The town is located just to the east of an oasis; separated by a line of sand dunes.

Climate 

Foggaret Ezzoua has a hot desert climate (Köppen climate classification BWh), with extremely hot summers and mild winters, and very little precipitation throughout the year.

Transportation

Foggaret Ezzoua is connected to the N1 highway just north of In Salah by a local road, passing the villages of Igostène and Hassi Lahdjar on the way. Another track leads south to the villages of Silafène and Hinoune.

Education

4.5% of the population has a tertiary education, and another 16.5% has completed secondary education. The overall literacy rate is 82.2%, and is 91.1% among males and 72.4% among females; all three figures are the second highest in the province after the commune of In Ghar.

Localities 
The commune is composed of five localities:

Fouggaret Ezzoua
Silafène
Hinoune
Foggaret el Arab
Laarab

References 

Neighbouring towns and cities

Tuareg
Communes of In Salah Province